Guazuvirá or Guazú-Virá is a seaside resort in Canelones Department, Uruguay. Its name is the Guarani word for "gray brocket" (Mazama gouazoubira).

References

External links
INE map of San Luis, Araminda, Los Titanes, La Tuna and Guazú-Virá
 Website of Guazuvirá

Populated places in the Canelones Department
Seaside resorts in Uruguay